Denti (Teeth) is a 2000 Italian comedy-drama film directed by Gabriele Salvatores. It is based on the novel with the same name written by Domenico Starnone.
It entered the competition at the 57th Venice International Film Festival.

Plot
Antonio has always had problems with his incisors: enormous and therefore embarrassing. During a quarrel Mara, the woman for whom he left his wife and two children and of whom he is extremely jealous, throws him a crystal ashtray breaking his teeth. He begins his wandering among dentists that will turn into a sort of journey in his own conscience, altered by painkillers, by quarrels with Mara and by memories and ghosts that resurface.

Cast 
Sergio Rubini as Antonio
Anita Caprioli as Mara
Paolo Villaggio as Dr. Cagnano
Claudio Amendola as  Young Antonio  
Anouk Grinberg as  Mother of Antonio
Fabrizio Bentivoglio as  Uncle Nino
Tom Novembre: as  Micco
Angela Goodwin as Ciuta
Barbara Cupisti as   Dr. Calandra's Secretary

References

External links

2000 films
Italian drama films
2000s Italian-language films
Films directed by Gabriele Salvatores
2000 drama films
2000s Italian films